Cool Cat, (subtitled Chet Baker Plays, Chet Baker Sings) is an album by trumpeter/vocalist Chet Baker which was recorded in 1986 and released on the Dutch Timeless label.

Reception 

Steve Loewy of AllMusic states, "The tunes are just a tad different than usual, so Baker was forced to suspend his autopilot and dig in. Only partially satisfying, there are nonetheless enough worthwhile moments to recommend this one".

Track listing 
 "Swift Shifting" (Harold Danko) – 7:25
 "'Round Midnight" (Thelonious Monk, Cootie Williams) – 10:19
 "Caravelle" (Jon Burr) – 5:53
 "For All We Know" (J. Fred Coots, Sam M. Lewis) – 5:13
 "Blue Moon" (Richard Rodgers, Lorenz Hart) – 6:32
 "My Foolish Heart" (Victor Young, Ned Washington) – 7:41

Personnel 
Chet Baker – trumpet, vocals
Harold Danko – piano
Jon Burr – bass
Ben Riley – drums

References 

Chet Baker albums
1989 albums
Timeless Records albums